Fail-deadly is a concept in nuclear military strategy that encourages deterrence by guaranteeing an immediate, automatic, and overwhelming response to an attack, even if there is no one to trigger such retaliation. The term fail-deadly was coined as a contrast to fail-safe.

Military usage

Fail-deadly operation is an example of second-strike strategy, in that aggressors are discouraged from attempting a first strike attack. Under fail-deadly nuclear deterrence, policies and procedures controlling the retaliatory strike authorize launch even if the existing command and control structure has already been neutralized by a first strike. The deterrent efficacy of such a system clearly depends on other nuclear-armed nations having foreknowledge of it. The Soviet Union used a fail-deadly system known as Dead Hand (codenamed "Perimeter"); after the collapse of the Soviet Union, Russia retained the system (although it is now only activated in times of crisis).

Fail-deadly can refer to specific technology components, or the controls system as a whole. The United Kingdom's fail-deadly policies delegate strike authority to submarine commanders in the event of a loss of command (using letters of last resort), ensuring that even when uncoordinated, nuclear retaliation can be carried out.

An example of the implementation of such a strategy could be: US Navy ballistic missile submarines are ordered to surface at periodic intervals to receive communications indicating that no change has occurred in the defense condition. Should the submarines be unable to receive the proper command and control signals indicating normal, peacetime conditions, their orders would be to launch their nuclear missiles under the assumption that command and control structures had been destroyed in a nuclear attack and that retaliation was therefore necessary. All available means of verification and all due caution would naturally be applied. This approach is obviously exceptionally dangerous for a variety of reasons, as any benign communications disruption due to technical failure could conceivably incite a completely unnecessary nuclear war. The strategy's intended value lies in deterrence against attack on command, control, communications, and computer (see C4I) networks by any potential adversary.

Fail-deadly is also associated with massive retaliation, a deterrence strategy that ensures that the counterstrike will be conducted on a larger scale than the initial attack.

See also
 Doomsday device
 Fail-safe
 Failing badly
 Launch on warning
 Mutual assured destruction
 Dead man's switch
 Special Weapons Emergency Separation System
 Two Generals' Problem
 Dead Hand (nuclear war)
 AN/DRC-8 Emergency Rocket Communications System
 Samson Option
 Dr. Strangelove

References

Nuclear strategy
Nuclear command and control